Sainte-Julienne is a community and municipality in Lanaudière, Quebec, Canada. According to the 2021 Canadian census, the community has a population of 11,173 The Sainte-Julienne Aerodrome is located in Sainte-Julienne.

Education

Commission scolaire des Samares operates Francophone public schools:
 École secondaire de Sainte-Julienne
 École de Sainte-Julienne
 pavillon des Boutons-d'Or
 pavillon des Explorateurs
 pavillon Notre-Dame-de-Fatima
 pavillon des Virevents

Sir Wilfrid Laurier School Board operates Anglophone public schools:
 Rawdon Elementary School in Rawdon
 Joliette High School in Joliette

Notable people
 Audrey De Montigny - former Canadian Idol finalist.
 Zotique Mageau (1865-1951) - Member of Provincial Parliament of Ontario

See also
 Municipal reorganization in Quebec

References

External links

 

Municipalities in Quebec
Incorporated places in Lanaudière